How the Earth Was Made is a documentary television series produced by Pioneer Productions for the History channel. It began as a two-hour special exploring the geological history of Earth, airing on December 16, 2007. Focusing on different geologic features of the Earth, the series premiered on February 10, 2009, and the 13-episode first season concluded on May 5, 2009. The second season premiered on November 24, 2009, and concluded on March 2, 2010.

Overview 
How the Earth Was Made premiered as a 90-minute documentary special, narrated by Edward Herrmann, that aired on The History Channel on December 16, 2007, and focused on the geological history of Earth. The History Channel released the original documentary film to Region 1 DVD through Warner Home Video on April 15, 2008, and to Blu-ray through A&E Home Video on May 26, 2009.

The television series premiered on February 10, 2009. Each 45-minute episode focuses on different geologic features and processes of the Earth. The first season, spanning 13 episodes, concluded on May 5, 2009. The second season premiered on November 24, 2009. The first season of the television series was released as a four-volume Region 1 DVD box set on August 25, 2009. The second season was scheduled to be released on June 29, 2010. The Region 4, four-volume DVD set of season one was released by ABC DVD on August 1, 2010 and season two was released on November 1, 2010.

Reception 
The editor of the special, Huw Jenkins (although credited as Huw Jenkin), was awarded a 2008 News and Documentary Emmy Award for Outstanding Individual Achievement in a Craft: Editing, in a three-way tie.

In its first season, the television series averaged 1.4 million viewers.

International broadcast 
In Australia, the pilot along with both seasons were all broadcast on Pay television through History. For free-to-air viewers, season one also aired on ABC1 each Thursday at 11am from July 22, 2010.

Episodes

Pilot (2007)

Season 1 (2009)

Season 2 (2009–10)

References 

General

External links 
 
 
 
 
 

History (American TV channel) original programming
2000s American documentary television series
American documentary television films
Documentaries about geology
Documentary television series about science
Geological history of Earth
2009 American television series debuts
2010 American television series endings